Antoine Culioli (4 September 1924 – 9 February 2018) was a French linguist of Corsican origin. He developed a linguistic theory known as Théorie des Opérations Énonciatives (sometimes abbreviated as TOE). 

He was influenced by Émile Benveniste, Gustave Guillaume, and the Stoics.

Sources 
 A biographical note on Antoine Culioli.

References

1924 births
2018 deaths
Linguists from France